Erik Kurmangaliev (January 2, 1959 – November 13, 2007) was a Russian-Kazakh opera singer, actor and a leading public figure in Russia's perestroika music scene.

Early life
Kurmangaliev was born in Kazakhstan, which at the time was part of the Soviet Union. He attended a music conservatory in the city of Almaty, and later transferred to the Gnessin State Musical College in Moscow. He was known for an unusual countertenor voice.

Career
Kurmangaliev debuted in 1980 at the Leningrad Philharmonia. He later performed in Alfred Shnitke's Second Symphony and Dr. Faust cantata during his career. His career reached his peak when he teamed up with director Roman Viktyuk in the early 1990s, when he appeared in the Russian language version of David Hwang's M. Butterfly. Kurmangaliev made his last appearance in film appearance in Rustam Khamdamov's Parallel Voices.

At one time, Kurmangaliev acted under nickname Erik Salim-Meruert, which are the combined names of his father and mother.

Death
He died in Moscow on November 13, 2007, of a liver infection at the age of 47.

References

External links
 Obituary (in Russian)
 

1959 births
2007 deaths
Deaths from liver disease
Infectious disease deaths in Russia
Operatic countertenors
Place of birth missing
Russian male actors
20th-century Russian male opera singers
Russian people of Kazakhstani descent
Burials at Vagankovo Cemetery